Peche Di is a transgender model, dancer, actress, videographer, and modeling agent.  She started the first transgender modeling agency in the U.S., in New York City. Di was born in Bangkok, Thailand. After winning several pageants, entered America’s Next Top Model competition in New York City.

In 2014, Di was featured on the fifth anniversary cover of C☆NDY magazine along with 13 other transgender women.

Di founded Trans Models NYC, a modeling agency focusing on transgender representation in modeling, in May 2015.

See also
 LGBT culture in New York City
 List of LGBT people from New York City

References

Transgender female models
Peche Di
LGBT people from New York (state)
Year of birth missing (living people)
Living people